Muddy is a small incorporated village located in the Harrisburg Township in Saline County, Illinois, United States. The population was 78 at the 2000 census.

History

During the 19th century, the site of Muddy was home to a small settlement known as Robinson's Ford, which was among the communities considered for the seat of Saline County after the county's creation in the 1840s.  The modern village of Muddy had its start as a mining settlement established by the Harrisburg Big Muddy Coal Company, for which it was named, in 1903.  The mine was sold to the larger O'Gara Coal Company in 1906.

The disused St. Ioasaph Orthodox Church in Muddy, built in 1913, is dedicated to Ioasaph of Belgorod. This church was attended by eastern European immigrants, including Russians, Slovaks, Poles, and Rusyns,

Geography
Muddy is located at  (37.764086, -88.514469).  The village lies along U.S. Route 45 northeast of Harrisburg and southwest of Eldorado.  The Middle Fork of the Saline River flows just southwest of Muddy.  The Tunnel Hill State Trail, a  rail trail, passes through the village.

Demographics

As of the census of 2000, there were 78 people, 34 households, and 21 families residing in the village. The racial makeup of the village was 88.46% White, 5.13% African American, 2.56% Native American, 3.85% from other races. Hispanic or Latino of any race were 3.85% of the population.

There were 34 households, out of which 38.2% had children under the age of 18 living with them, 44.1% were married couples living together, 8.8% had a female householder with no husband present, and 38.2% were non-families. 38.2% of all households were made up of individuals, and 8.8% had someone living alone who was 65 years of age or older. The average household size was 2.29 and the average family size was 2.95.

In the village, the population was spread out, with 24.4% under the age of 18, 17.9% from 18 to 24, 17.9% from 25 to 44, 26.9% from 45 to 64, and 12.8% who were 65 years of age or older. The median age was 34 years. For every 100 females, there were 110.8 males. For every 100 females age 18 and over, there were 90.3 males.

The median income for a household in the village was $24,375, and the median income for a family was $28,750. Males had a median income of $28,750 versus $28,250 for females. The per capita income for the village was $13,384. There were no families and 7.7% of the population living below the poverty line, including no under eighteens and none of those over 64.

References

External links

Villages in Saline County, Illinois
Villages in Illinois
Coal towns in Illinois